John Carlin (born 12 May 1956) is a British journalist and author, who deals with both sports and politics. His book Playing the Enemy: Nelson Mandela and the Game that Made a Nation, about former South African president Nelson Mandela, is the basis for the 2009 film Invictus.

Personal life
Carlin was born to a Scottish father and Spanish mother. He spent the first three years of his life in North London, before moving to Buenos Aires, Argentina, due to his father's posting to the British Embassy.

After returning to England, he was educated at St. George's College, Weybridge, and went on to earn an MA in English Language and Literature from Oxford University. He has one child.

Career
Carlin began his journalism career at the Buenos Aires Herald in 1981, writing about film, football and politics. In 1982, he began a six-year stint in Mexico and Central America working for, among others, The Times and Sunday Times, the Toronto Star, BBC, CBC, and ABC (US) before joining the staff of The Independent at the newspaper's launch in 1986.

Carlin was The Independent's South Africa bureau chief from 1989–1995. In 1993, Carlin wrote and presented a BBC documentary on the South African Third Force, his first television work.

From 1995–1998 he was the United States bureau chief for The Independent on Sunday.

In 1997, Carlin wrote an article titled "A Farewell to Arms" for Wired magazine about cyberwarfare. This was originally intended to form the basis of a 1999 film, WW3.com. When this project stalled, its script was rewritten into the 2007 film, Live Free or Die Hard (Die Hard 4.0).

In 1998, Carlin joined El País, the world's leading Spanish-language newspaper, where he worked as a senior international writer until being sacked in October 2017 after an article highly critical of the Spanish government and King regarding the Catalonian independence referendum. 

He has since written regularly for La Vanguardia. He also writes regularly for Argentine newspaper Clarín.

Carlin was writer and interviewer for the 1999 episode "The Long Walk of Nelson Mandela" of the American PBS series Frontline. It was also broadcast as "The First Accused" in South Africa by the SABC.

Awards
Carlin won the 2000 Spanish Ortega y Gasset Award for journalism, for an article in Spanish newspaper El País. In 2004 he won the British Press Awards "Food and Drink Writer of the Year" prize. He has won numerous other awards for his writing in Spain and Italy.

Nelson Mandela
Much of Carlin's career has dealt with the politics of South Africa.

In a 1998 interview, Mandela said of Carlin's journalism: "What you wrote and the way in which you carried out your task in this country was absolutely magnificent…it was absolutely inspiring. You have been very courageous, saying things which many journalists would never say." Mandela wrote the foreword to Carlin's 2004 Spanish language book, Heroica Tierra Cruel, about Africa.

In August 2008, Carlin published the book Playing the Enemy: Nelson Mandela and the Game that Made a Nation, about how Mandela used the 1995 Rugby World Cup to reconcile a nation driven by centuries of racial animosity. The book became the basis for Clint Eastwood's 2009 film, Invictus, starring Morgan Freeman as Mandela.

Carlin has written for, among others, The Times, the Financial Times, the New York Times, Wall Street Journal, The Observer, the Guardian, the New Statesman, Wired and New Republic.

Other works
In August 2011, Carlin collaborated with tennis superstar Rafael Nadal on the latter's autobiography Rafa (Hyperion, 2012).

Filmography
War on Peace (Documentary, BBC) (1993) (Writer/Interviewer)
The Long Walk of Nelson Mandela (Documentary) PBS Frontline (1999) (Writer/Cast)
Live Free or Die Hard (2007) (Script/Article)
Invictus (2009) (Book)
The 16th Man (Documentary, ESPN)  (2010) (Writer/Producer)

Bibliography
 Chase Your Shadow: The Trials of Oscar Pistorius, Atlantic Books (UK), 2014
 Rafa, Hyperion (US),  and Little Brown (UK), August 2011
 Playing the Enemy: Nelson Mandela and the Game that Made a Nation, Penguin, August 2008
 Heroica Tierra Cruel , September 2004 
 White Angels: Beckham, Real Madrid and the New Football, Bloomsbury, September 2004

Comics
 Mandela and the General, Plough Publishing House (US), November 2018 (Writer, with art by Oriol Malet)

References

External links
 
 John Carlin at Journalisted.com
 
 The Long Walk of Nelson Mandela PBS.org

1956 births
English people of Spanish descent
English expatriates in Argentina
English male journalists
20th-century English male writers
Living people
Alumni of Lincoln College, Oxford
English people of Scottish descent
People educated at St George's College, Weybridge
English expatriates in Mexico
El País people
The Times people
The Independent people
La Vanguardia people
English expatriates in South Africa